Bijendra Pal Singh is an Indian politician. He is a member of the Uttar Pradesh parliament Sambhal (Lok Sabha constituency). He first got elected in 1980 as a member of the Indian National Congress political party.

References 

Living people
Indian National Congress politicians from Uttar Pradesh
Year of birth missing (living people)